In mathematics, a subset  of a Polish space  is universally measurable if it is measurable with respect to every complete probability measure on  that measures all Borel subsets of .

Every analytic set is universally measurable.  It follows from projective determinacy, which in turn follows from sufficient large cardinals, that every projective set is universally measurable.

Finiteness condition

The condition that the measure be a probability measure; that is, that the measure of  itself be 1, is less restrictive than it may appear. For example, Lebesgue measure on the reals is not a probability measure, yet every universally measurable set is Lebesgue measurable. To see this, divide the real line into countably many intervals of length 1; say, N0=[0,1), N1=[1,2), N2=[-1,0), N3=[2,3), N4=[-2,-1), and so on. Now letting μ be Lebesgue measure, define a new measure ν by
 
Then easily ν is a probability measure on the reals, and a set is ν-measurable if and only if it is Lebesgue measurable. More generally a universally measurable set must be measurable with respect to every sigma-finite measure that measures all Borel sets.

Example contrasting with Lebesgue measurability

Suppose  is a subset of Cantor space ; that is,  is a set of infinite sequences of zeroes and ones. By putting a binary point before such a sequence, the sequence can be viewed as a real number between 0 and 1 (inclusive), with some unimportant ambiguity.

Now it follows from the axiom of choice that there are some such  without a well-defined Lebesgue measure (or coin-flipping measure). This is a pathological property of  that says that  is "very complicated" or "ill-behaved".

From such a set , form a new set  by performing the following operation on each sequence in :  Intersperse a 0 at every even position in the sequence, moving the other bits to make room.

However  is not universally measurable. To see that, we can test it against a biased coin that always comes up tails on even-numbered flips, and is fair on odd-numbered flips. For a set of sequences to be universally measurable, an arbitrarily biased coin may be used (even one that can "remember" the sequence of flips that has gone before) and the probability that the sequence of its flips ends up in the set must be well-defined. However, when  is tested by the coin we mentioned (the one  that always comes up tails on even-numbered flips, and is fair on odd-numbered flips), the probability to hit  is not well defined (for the same reason why  cannot be tested by the fair coin). Thus,  is not universally measurable.

References

 
 

Descriptive set theory
Determinacy
Measure theory